"Cherry Wine" is a song by American rapper Nas, released in 2012 by Def Jam Recordings as the fourth single from his 2012 album Life Is Good. The single features vocals by singer Amy Winehouse and was nominated for Best Rap/Sung Collaboration at the 2013 Grammy Awards. It is the final single to feature vocals from Winehouse.

Writing and recording 
Speaking to NME, Nas expressed that "Cherry Wine" came from "God, and Amy". Asked if record producer Salaam Remi had "Cherry Wine" from their recording sessions together, he said: "Yeah, Salaam worked on her last album, and they were working. We don’t even have an explanation for how it happened. It was just magic. It just happened. It was supposed to happen. She made it happen." Lyrically, "Cherry Wine" finds Nas expressing his ongoing search for his perfect mate.

Music video 
The music video for "Cherry Wine" premiered on October 2, 2012, and portrays Nas as a bartender, while images of Amy Winehouse are projected onto the brick walls of the bar.  The video ends with a picture of Winehouse beside the dedication "In Memory of Amy Winehouse (1983–2011)".

Accolades 
"Cherry Wine" was nominated for Best Rap/Sung Collaboration at the 55th Grammy Awards in 2013.

Track listing 
Digital download
"Cherry Wine" (Album Version) — 5:56

Personnel 
Credits adapted from liner notes.

John Adams – Rhodes piano
Vincent Henry – tenor, alto sax, flute, clarinet
Gleyder "GEE" Dida – recording
Gary Noble – recording, mixing
Salaam Remi – producer, arranger, bass, drums
Brian Sumner – recording
Amy Winehouse – guitar

Charts

Release history

References 

2012 singles
Nas songs
Amy Winehouse songs
Songs written by Nas
Song recordings produced by Salaam Remi
Songs written by Salaam Remi
Songs written by Amy Winehouse
2012 songs
Def Jam Recordings singles